Metron Aviation, a subsidiary of Airbus, is an Air Traffic Management Services company based in Herndon, VA, with secondary offices in Washington, DC and Atlantic City, NJ. The company specializes in concept engineering in aviation, advanced research, software development related to aerospace, traffic flow management, surface operations management, airspace design and environmental analysis solutions for the global aviation industry.

Origins

The company was founded in 1995, Metron Aviation provides services in Air Traffic Flow Management, working with the Federal Aviation Administration (FAA) to develop a Collaborative Decision Making (CDM) platform for optimizing system-wide traffic flow.

Airbus Acquisition
In July 2011, Airbus announced it had entered into a definitive agreement to acquire the privately held Metron Aviation, Inc. In 2012, Metron Aviation was reorganized and aligned to support the launch of Airbus Pro-sky, the Toulouse, France-based ATM subsidiary of Airbus. Today Metron Aviation has around 100 employees, down from a high of at least 200 in 2011.

Customers
Metron Aviation's business is currently composed of 70% Advanced Research and Engineering and 30% Commercial Products and Solutions. Current and past customers include: FAA, NASA, NAV CANADA, Air services Australia, ATNS South Africa, Air Canada, Alaska Airlines, American Airlines, Delta Air Lines, Express-jet Airlines, FedEx Express, Jazz Aviation, Jet Blue Airways, Net Jets, Spirit Airlines, Southwest Airlines, United Airlines, US Airways, Virgin America Airlines, and WestJet Airlines.

References

1. ^http://www.marketwatch.com/story/airbus-to-buy-us-firm-metron-aviation-2011-07-26.

Companies based in Dulles, Virginia